Total of 308683  meters is length of canals in the central city of Isfahan

References

Canals in Iran
Isfahan